A National Parkway is a designation for a protected area in the United States. The designation is given to a scenic roadway and a protected corridor of surrounding parkland.  National Parkways often connect cultural or historic sites.  The U.S. National Park Service manages the parkways.


History

Parkways

The first parkways in the United States were developed in the late 19th century by landscape architects Frederick Law Olmsted and Beatrix Farrand as roads segregated for pedestrians, bicyclists, equestrians, and horse carriages, such as the Eastern Parkway and Ocean Parkway in Brooklyn, New York.  The terminology "parkway" to define this type of road was coined by Calvert Vaux and Olmsted in their proposal to link city and suburban parks with "pleasure roads." Newer roads such as the Bidwell and Lincoln Parkways in Buffalo, New York, were designed for automobiles and are broad and divided by large landscaped central medians. Parkways can be the approach to large urban parks, such as the Mystic Valley Parkway to Boston Common in Boston. Some separated express lanes from local lanes, though this was not always the case.

During the early 20th century, the meaning of the word was expanded to include controlled-access highways designed for recreational driving of automobiles with landscaping. These parkways originally provided scenic routes without at-grade intersections, very slow vehicles, or pedestrian traffic. Their success led to more development however, expanding a city's boundaries, eventually limiting their recreational driving use. The Arroyo Seco Parkway between Downtown Los Angeles and Pasadena, California, is an example of lost pastoral aesthetics. It and others have become major commuting routes, while retaining the name parkway.

National parkways
In the 1930s, as part of the New Deal, the U.S. federal government constructed national parkways designed for recreational driving, and to commemorate historic trails and routes. As with other roads through national parks, these mostly undivided and two-lane parkways have lower speed limits, and are maintained by the National Park Service and the Federal Highway Administration jointly through the Federal Lands Transportation Program. An example is the Civilian Conservation Corps-built Blue Ridge Parkway in the Appalachian Mountains of North Carolina and Virginia. Others are: Skyline Drive in Virginia; John D. Rockefeller, Jr. Memorial Parkway in Wyoming, the Natchez Trace Parkway in Mississippi, Alabama, and Tennessee; and the Colonial Parkway in eastern Virginia's Historic Triangle area.  The George Washington Memorial Parkway and the Clara Barton Parkway, running along the Potomac River near Washington, D.C., were also constructed during this era.

List
Four parkways are stand-alone units of the National Park System: Blue Ridge Parkway, George Washington Parkway, John D. Rockefeller Memorial Parkway, and Natchez Trace Parkway. Others are managed as part of another unit. 

The Great River Road was originally envisioned as a National Parkway.

See also

List of United States federally maintained roads
Scenic byways in the United States

References

External links

Parkways – Transportation National Park Service

Protected areas of the United States
Historic trails and roads in the United States